R. Scott Gemmill is an American television writer and producer, born in Canada. He worked extensively on JAG and ER. Since its eighth season, he is now the showrunner of NCIS: Los Angeles.

Gemmill worked on JAG as an executive story editor and writer. He joined the crew in the first season and remained until the fourth season writing a total of 18 episodes. He was nominated for a Humanitas Prize in the 60 minute category for his work on the JAG episode "Angels 30."

He joined the crew of ER in its sixth season as a supervising producer and regular writer. Alongside his fellow ER producers he was twice nominated for an Emmy Award for best drama series for his work on the sixth and seventh seasons of the show. He worked on the series until the thirteenth season and wrote a total of thirty-two episodes. In 2007 he won a Humanitas Prize in the 60 minute category for his work on the ER season 12 episode "There Are No Angels Here." The award was shared with his co-writer David Zabel. The episode followed doctors from County General who traveled overseas to provide aid work in a refugee camp in Darfur. Humanitas stated that the prize was awarded for the episodes "unflinching look at the brutality inherent in civil wars and its belief that heroism is complex, complicated and multi-layered."

He went on to work on the short-lived series Smith as a writer and executive producer. After the cancellation of Smith he worked as a writer and executive producer on Women's Murder Club. When that series also proved short-lived he took a position as a consulting producer and writer on The Unit. After that program ended he became a writer and executive producer on the fall 2009 series NCIS: Los Angeles.

References

External links

Living people
American television producers
American male screenwriters
JAG (TV series)
NCIS (franchise)
Year of birth missing (living people)
Showrunners